W. Scott Corbett (July 27, 1913 – March 6, 2006) was an American novelist and educator. Beginning 1950 he wrote five adult novels, then began writing books for children. He retired from teaching in 1965 to write full-time. His best known book is The Lemonade Trick, a novel for children. One of his books, entitled The Reluctant Landlord (1950), was made into the 1951 film Love Nest. He wrote his first children's book, Susie Sneakers, in 1956. According to a Providence Journal obituary, he wrote 81 books "including 34 that he aimed at children". According to the de Grummond Children's Literature Collection that holds his papers, he wrote "at least sixty-seven fiction and non-fiction books for children".

Corbett received a bachelor of journalism degree from the University of Missouri in 1934. During World War II he was a member of the 42nd Infantry Division of the United States Army. In this position, he also served as a correspondent for Stars and Stripes, the United States's military newspaper in Europe, and also served as the last editor of Yank, the Army Weekly, an Army magazine based in Paris. He was one of the first correspondents to enter the Dachau concentration camp in Germany just before the end of the war.

Corbett moved with his wife to Providence, Rhode Island in 1957, and, in addition to his writing, taught at the Moses Brown School. He died at his home in Providence at the age of ninety-two. He was a member of the Rhode Island Heritage Hall of Fame. His novel Cutlass Island won the Edgar Allan Poe award in 1962 from the Mystery Writers of America as the best mystery written for children. In 1976, The Home Run Trick won the Mark Twain Award, an honor voted by the schoolchildren of Missouri. Many of Corbett's books were written while at sea, as he and his wife traveled extensively via freighter.

References

External links

 Scott Corbett bibliography at Damfino.com
 
 Scott Corbett at Library of Congress Authorities — with 74 catalog records

 

1913 births
2006 deaths
Writers from Kansas City, Missouri
20th-century American novelists
American children's writers
University of Missouri alumni
Writers from Providence, Rhode Island
United States Army personnel of World War II
American male novelists
Edgar Award winners
20th-century American male writers
Novelists from Missouri
American war correspondents of World War II